John Wallace "Wally" Southern (26 October 1921 – 8 March 2003) was an Australian rules footballer who played with Geelong, South Melbourne and St Kilda in the Victorian Football League (VFL).

Southern came to the VFL from North Geelong. He made one appearance for Geelong in the 1941 VFL season and also played a single game for South Melbourne in the 1943 season. In 1944 he went back to Geelong and got to play a full season, missing only one game all year. He spent one more season at Geelong, and then went to St Kilda in 1946, where he played four games. After moving to Adelaide in 1948, Southern began playing for Sturt. He initially played seniors, and then captained their B Grade team and in 1952 won the B Grade Magarey Medal.

References

1921 births
2003 deaths
Australian rules footballers from Victoria (Australia)
Geelong Football Club players
St Kilda Football Club players
Sydney Swans players
Sturt Football Club players
North Geelong Football Club players